Aulonosoma is a genus of beetles in the family Passandridae.

Species
 Aulonosoma basalis Grouvelle
 Aulonosoma insignis Grouvelle
 Aulonosoma tenebrioides Motschulsky

References

Passandridae